Kadua is a genus of flowering plants in the family Rubiaceae. It comprises 29 species, all restricted to Polynesia. Twenty-two of these are endemic to the Hawaiian Islands. Some of the species are common at high elevation. Others are single-island endemics or very rare, and a few are probably extinct. Kadua affinis is widely distributed in Hawaii and is polymorphic. The type species for the genus is Kadua acuminata.

Kadua was formerly included in a broadly defined and polyphyletic Hedyotis, which encompassed, in addition to Kadua, species now placed in Oldenlandia, Oldenlandiopsis, Houstonia, and other genera. Hedyotis is now circumscribed more narrowly.

Species
In the following list, Kadua haupuensis is added to the species listed by Edward E. Terrell et alii.

History

The genus Kadua was erected in 1829 by Adelbert von Chamisso and Diederich von Schlechtendal. They named it for Kadu, a native of Ulea, one of the Marshall Islands. Kadu was a friend of von Chamisso and provided valuable assistance to the 1815–1818 expedition led by Otto von Kotzebue. The generic name Kadua fell into disuse in the 20th century, because most authors considered it to be a synonym of Hedyotis. In 1999, twenty species of Kadua were described as species of Hedyotis in a Flora of Hawaii. Kadua flynnii was described in 1998, and Kadua haupuensis in 2010. Kadua was resurrected in 2005. This taxonomic change was corroborated by molecular phylogenetic studies of the tribe Spermacoceae in 2008 and 2009.

Phylogeny
The following phylogenetic tree is partly based on a phylogenetic analysis of DNA sequences, and partly inferred from the classification followed in a 2005 paper.

References

External links

 Kadua At: Search Page At: World Checklist of Rubiaceae At: Index by Team At: Projects At: Science Directory At: Scientific Research and Data At: Kew Gardens
 Kadua At: Index Nominum Genericorum At: References At: NMNH Department of Botany
 Kadua In: Linnaea, volume 4 At: Linnaea At: Titles At: Botanicus
 Kadua At: Plant Name Query At: IPNI
 Kadua (exact) At: Names At: Tropicos At: Science and Conservation At: Missouri Botanical Garden
 Kadua At: List of Genera At: Rubiaceae At: List of families At: Families and Genera in GRIN At: Queries At: GRIN taxonomy for plants
 Kadua At: Spermacoceae At: Rubioideae At: Rubiaceae In: ··· Embryophyta At: Streptophytina At: Streptophyta At: Viridiplantae At: Eudaryota At: Taxonomy At: UniProt
 Hedyotis  At: List by Species Name At: Hawaiian Ethnobotany Online Database At: Searchable Databases At: Bishop Museum
 Kadua littoralis At: Choose a Plant At: Meet the Plants At: National Tropical Botanical Garden
 Kadua affinis At: Rubiaceae At: Plants of Hawaii At: Images At: Hawaiian Ecosystems at Risk

 
Flora of the Pacific
Rubiaceae genera
Taxa named by Adelbert von Chamisso